Chaetonectrioides is a fungal genus in the Ascomycota. It is a monotypic genus containing the sole species Chaetonectrioides malaysiana, found in Peninsular Malaysia.

References

External links

Fungi of Asia
Monotypic Dothideomycetes genera